Henry Richard Vizetelly (30 July 18201 January 1894) was a British publisher and writer. He started the publications Pictorial Times and Illustrated Times, wrote several books while working in Paris and Berlin as correspondent for the Illustrated London News, and between 1880 and 1890, ran a publishing house in London, Vizetelly & Company.

Life and career
Vizetelly was born in London, the son of a printer. He was early apprenticed as a wood-engraver, and one of his first woodblocks was a portrait of Old Parr. He was in San Francisco, California, when gold was discovered in 1849. His book California (written under the pseudonym "J. Tyrwhitt Brooks") recounts his adventures for four months in the gold fields. In his 1893 autobiography, Glances Back Through Seventy Years, he admits it was an elaborate hoax, having never left London and wrote the book in just a few short weeks.

In 1843, encouraged by the success of the Illustrated London News, Vizetelly, with his brother James Thomas Vizetelly (1817–1897) and Andrew Spottiswoode (1787–1866), started the Pictorial Times, which was published successfully for several years. In 1855, in partnership with the bookseller David Bogue (1812-1856), he started a three-penny paper called the Illustrated Times, which four years later was merged in the Penny Illustrated Paper. His other brother, Frank Vizetelly (1830–1883) was a war artist for both sides during the American Civil War and went to Egypt as war correspondent for the Illustrated London News. He was never heard of after the massacre of Hicks Pasha's army in Kordofan.

In 1865 Vizetelly became Paris correspondent for the Illustrated London News. During the years he remained in Paris he published several books: Paris in Peril (1882), The Story of the Diamond Necklace (1867) and a free translation of Marius Topin's L'homme au masque de fer (1870) under the title The Man in the Iron Mask.

In 1872 Vizetelly was transferred to Berlin, where he wrote Berlin under the New Empire (1879).

In 1880 he established a publishing house in London, Vizetelly & Company. They issued numerous translations of French and Russian authors, such as the first English translation of Flaubert's Madame Bovary, made by Eleanor Marx in 1886. In 1887, they launched the Mermaid Series of reprints of English Elizabethan, Jacobean and Restoration drama, and in 1888 he was prosecuted for obscene libel for publishing the translation of Zola's La Terre (The Soil), and was fined £100. In 1889, when he continued to sell Zola's works, he was again prosecuted, fined £200, and imprisoned for three months and Vizetelly & Co subsequently went bankrupt by the end of 1890.

In 1893 he wrote a volume of autobiographical reminiscence called Glances Back through Seventy Years, a graphic picture of literary Bohemia in Paris and London between 1840 and 1870. He died on 1 January 1894 at "Heatherlands", Tilford, near Farnham in Surrey.

Henry Vizetelly's interest in wines led to the creation of several books. The Wines of the World Characterized & Classed: with some particulars respecting the beers of Europe was published in 1875 and Facts About Champagne and Other Sparkling Wines Collected During Numerous Visits to the Champagne and Other Viticultural Districts of France, and the Principal Remaining Wine-Producing Countries of Europe was published in 1879. He was Wine Juror for Great Britain at the Vienna and Paris Exhibitions of 1873 and 1878. In 1882 he wrote A History of Champagne: with notes on the other sparkling wines of France.

He had four sons by his first wife, notably Ernest Alfred Vizetelly (1853–1922) who edited and had republished some of the Zola translations previously published by his father. By his second wife, Elizabeth Anne Ansell, he had a daughter and a son, Frank Horace Vizetelly (1864–1938), who was a lexicographer, etymologist and editor.

Vizetelly was appointed knight of the Order of Franz Joseph.

Book series
Vizetelly published 21 series between 1880 and 1890 and further series as early as 1852:
 Du Boisgobey's Sensational Novels
 Boulevard Novels
 Celebrated Russian Novels
 Cream of the Diarists and Memoir Writers
 Eighteenth-Century Illustrated Books
 French Sensational Novels (AKA Celebrated Sensational Novels)
 Gaboriau's Sensational Novels
 Grenville-Murray
 Henry Vizetelly's Books
 The Mermaid Series
 Miscellaneous Shilling books
 Moore's Realistic Novels
 People who have Made a Noise in the World
 Popular French Novels
 Readable Books
 Sala
 Sensational Stories
 Sixpenny Series of Amusing and Entertaining Books (AKA Vizetelly's Amusing Books)
 The Social Zoo
 Vizetelly's Half-Crown Series
 Vizetelly's One-Volume Novels
 Zola's Realistic Novels

References

External links
 Thomas Seccombe, ‘Vizetelly, Henry Richard (1820–1894)’, rev. P. D. Edwards, Oxford Dictionary of National Biography, Oxford University Press, 2004, accessed 2 January 2008.
 Henry Vizetelly (1820 - 1894) at Royal Academy of Art
 
 
 
 

1820 births
1894 deaths
Wine critics
Recipients of the Order of Franz Joseph
British book publishers (people)
19th-century British journalists
Male journalists
19th-century male writers
19th-century British businesspeople